Mamaia is a resort on the Romanian Black Sea shore and a district of Constanța.

Considered to be Romania's most popular resort, Mamaia is situated immediately north-east of Constanța's city center. It has almost no full-time residents, being populated mostly during the summer.

Mamaia lies on a strip of land  in length and only  in width, between the Black Sea and Lake Siutghiol.

The water stays warm until mid autumn.

Hotels range from mid-end to exclusive 4- and 5-star hotels and private clubs. There are also camping sites in the north.

The 11th reunion of the Central European heads of state took place in Mamaia on 27–28 May 2004.

Climate
The district of Mamaia has a humid subtropical climate (Köppen climate classification: Cfa) bordering an oceanic climate (Cfb) with slightly semi-arid influences. The winters are cool with occasional frost in the dawn.
The summers are warm with temperatures seldom exceeding 32°C. 
The rain is regular all year round.

Gallery

See also 
Tourism in Romania

References

External links

Mamaia Resort

Seaside resorts in Romania
Constanța